Erling Walderhaug (born 24 November 1942) is a Norwegian politician for the Conservative Party.

He served as a deputy representative to the Norwegian Parliament from Hordaland during the term 1989–1993. He met during 13 days of parliamentary session.

On the local level he was the mayor of Fedje until 2007.

References

1942 births
Living people
Conservative Party (Norway) politicians
Deputy members of the Storting
Mayors of places in Hordaland
Place of birth missing (living people)
20th-century Norwegian politicians